Jamia Baitussalam is a modern religious madrassa located in Talagang, Punjab, Pakistan. It was founded in 2013 by Maulana Abdus Sattar. The institue provides Quran memorization and Dars Nizami, O Level, A Level and Matriculation. The madrassa is known for hi-tech and robotic.

History
Maulana Abdul Sattar from the same area established the first Bait Salam in Karachi. A few years later in 2013 he established the jamia which is running under the Baitussalam Welfare Trust. It was inaugurated by Saleemullah Khan in 2013.

Departments
 Department of Dar-ul-Quran Hifz
 Department of Contemporary Education
 Department of Religious Studies

References

2013 establishments in Pakistan
Talagang District
Educational institutions established in 2013
Islamic universities and colleges in Pakistan